William Boone may refer to:

 William Boone (American football) (1879–1963), American football coach in the United States
 William E. Boone (1830–1921), American architect
 William K. Boone (1875–1944), benefactor of Xalapa, Veracruz
 William Boone (mathematician) (1920–1983), American mathematician
 William Jones Boone (father) (1811–1864), first Anglican missionary bishop of Shanghai
 William Jones Boone (son) (1845–1891), fourth Anglican missionary bishop of Shanghai
 John William Boone (1864–1927), American ragtime music composer